Oliver Kjærgaard (born 2 May 1998) is a Danish professional footballer who plays as a midfielder for Eliteserien club HamKam.

Club career

Lyngby BK
Kjærgaard got his debut at the age of 17, on 8 December 2015 against AB in the Danish Cup, that Lyngby won 3-0. He came on the pitch in the 61nd minute, where he replaced Oke Akpoveta. He did also play 2 games for the club in that season, in the Danish 1st Division.

On 24 September 2016 Lyngby BK confirmed, that they had extended Kjærgaard's until 2019. But he continued playing for their U19 squad. He played his first match in the Danish Superliga on 31 March 2017 against FC Nordsjælland.

Due to the economic situation of Lyngby in 2018, he terminated his contract on 9 February 2018.

Tromsø IL
After leaving the club, he went on a trial at Tromsø IL. He signed officially for the club on 22 February 2018. He played his first game for the club in a 4-1 victory on 28 April 2018 against Sandefjord, where he entered the pitch in the 76th minute.

After playing only two games for Tromsø, Kjærgaard was loaned out to Nest-Sotra on 2 August 2018. He idea was, that he should act as a replacement for Johnny Furdals. The deal was for the rest of the year.

The deal was terminated on 2 January 2020.

FC Helsingør
Kjærgaard returned to Denmark and trained with FC Helsingør in about a month. On 5 March 2020 the club confirmed, that Kjærgaard had signed a contract until the end of the season. Kjærgaard left Helsingør in February 2023 after a total of 84 games, 11 goals and 6 assist.

HamKam
On 7 February 2023 it was confirmed, that Kjærgaard had returned to Norway, signing a deal until the end of 2025 with Eliteserien club HamKam, which had Danish Jakob Michelsen as head coach.

Career statistics

Club

References

External links
 
 Oliver Kjærgaard on DBU 
 Oliver Kjærgaard at Tromsø IL 

1998 births
Living people
Danish men's footballers
Association football forwards
Danish Superliga players
Danish 1st Division players
Danish 2nd Division players
Eliteserien players
Norwegian First Division players
Lyngby Boldklub players
Tromsø IL players
Nest-Sotra Fotball players
FC Helsingør players
Hamarkameratene players
Denmark youth international footballers
Danish expatriate men's footballers
Expatriate footballers in Norway
Danish expatriate sportspeople in Norway
People from Fredensborg Municipality
Sportspeople from the Capital Region of Denmark